Gennady Nikandrovich Volkov (31 October 1927 – 27 December 2010) was a Chuvash educator, writer and publicist. He was a professor, doctor of pedagogical sciences, and was an academic of the Russian Academy of Education. He founded ethnopedagogics.

Early life 
Volkov was born in the Big Yalchik village of the Yalchiksky District in the Chuvash Autonomous Soviet Socialist Republic. His father worked as a schoolteacher.

He graduated in Physics and Mathematics at Chuvash State Pedagogical Institute and the graduate school of the Kazan State Pedagogical Institute.

Career 
From 1952 to 1972, he worked as a senior lecturer and associate professor. He started the Department of Pedagogy and Psychology as a senior fellow and vice-rector for scientific work at the Chuvash State Pedagogical Institute.

From 1971 on, he worked in Moscow. He created the Ethnopedagogics Laboratory of the Institute of Family and Education of the Russian Academy of Education, and worked there for many years. From 1979 to 1982, he worked as a professor at Erfurt Higher Pedagogical School (Erfurt, GDR).

Personal life 
He died on December 27, 2010, in Cheboksary (Chuvashia). A monument to him was raised at 35 Lenin Prospect, Cheboksary, Chuvash Republic.

Publications 

 Волков Г. Н., Егоров В.Н. Чувашская народная педагогика: Очерки. – Cheboksary: Чувашгосиздат, 1958. – 244 с.
 Volkov G. N., Нравственное воспитание учащихся IV-VIII классов сельской национальной школы : Пособие для учителя. – М.: НИИ нац. шк., 1986. – 102 с.
 Volkov G. N., Педагогика жизни. – Cheboksary: Чуваш. кн. изд-во, 1989. – 334 с. – .
 Volkov G. N., Судьба патриарха : Роман-эссе. – Cheboksary: Чуваш. кн. изд-во, 1998. – 349 с. – .
 Volkov G. N., Этнопедагогика : Учеб. для студентов сред. и высш. пед. учеб. зав.. – Moscow: Academia, 2000. – 168 с. – .
 Volkov G. N., Педагогика любви : Избр. этнопед. соч. : [В 2 т.] / Сост. М. Н. Егоров. – Moscow: Магистр-Пресс, 2002. – Т. 2. – 460 с. – .
 Volkov G. N., Педагогика любви : Избр. этнопед. соч. : [В 2 т.] / Сост. М. Н. Егоров. – Moscow: Magistr-Press, 2002. – Т. 1. – 456 с. – .

References

External links 
 Викторов Г. А. Педагог современности // Учёные. – Чебоксары: Чуваш. кн. изд-во, 2006. – Т. 1. – С. 72—80. – (Библиотека Президента Чувашской Республики)
 7 книг на библусе
 Разумный В. А., Воспоминания современника о Г. Н. Волкове
 Хуторской А. В., Волков Геннадий Никандрович – вы знаете этого гениального человека?
 Педагогика любви // Якутия (газета). – 2010, 12 июля.
 After the scandalous session

Russian educators
Chuvash writers
1927 births
2010 deaths